The City of Bradford Metropolitan District Council elections were held on Thursday, 4 May 2000, with one third of the council up for election. Labour lost control of the council to no overall control.

Election result

This result had the following consequences for the total number of seats on the council after the elections:

Ward results

By-elections between 2000 and 2002

References

2000 English local elections
2000
2000s in West Yorkshire